Lady of Quality is the last Regency romance novel written by Georgette Heyer. It was first published in 1972 and was the last of her novels to be published during her lifetime.

The story describes the romantic relationship between Annis Wychwood, a wealthy spinster, and Oliver Carleton, a rake who cares little for society's opinion of him. The two meet while jointly supervising Carleton's ward, Lucilla. Heyer granted her heroine a level of independence that was rare in Regency times and rare for Heyer's novels. Although the hero's personality is similar to that of many of Heyer's other heroes, in a departure from romance novel convention he experienced little personal growth in the novel; his primary change was to accept that he would like to have a wife.

Heyer frequently highlights the heroine's many masculine qualities, which include a fierce independence and a disregard for social mores. Modern literary critics have noted that the relationship between the protagonists is modelled on those of the latter 20th century, offering companionship and allowing both parties to retain a level of independence. The heroine's unwillingness to conform attracts the hero, rather than repels him.

Background
British author Georgette Heyer essentially invented the Regency romance in 1935 with the publication of Regency Buck, and her early Regencies were quite successful. In 1950 she began to work on what she called "the magnum opus of my latter years", a medieval trilogy intended to cover the House of Lancaster between 1393 and 1435. To earn income, she periodically interrupted her research to write additional Regency romances; Lady of Quality, published in 1972, was the last of them, and the last of her novels to be published during her lifetime. Heyer suffered a stroke in July 1973 and was in ill health until her death the following year.

Plot summary
The novel is set in Regency England somewhere around 1818, and events are related through third-person narrative. As the story opens, a wealthy, beautiful and intelligent woman named Annis Wychwood reaches the age of majority. Now having greater control over her personal and financial affairs, Annis decides to move to Bath and live alone, to the displeasure of her brother and his family. Several years later, on the way back to Bath after a visit to her childhood home, Annis meets Lucilla Carleton and Ninian Elmore. Lucilla is running away to Bath to avoid her marriage to Ninian, a match that her guardian is very much in favour of, and Ninian is escorting her to ensure her safe arrival. Annis volunteers to chaperone Lucilla and notifies the girl's guardian of her plans.

Lucilla's guardian, Oliver Carleton, visits Bath to investigate her new living arrangements. Carleton is a rake – a sexually experienced man who refuses to conform to many of society's guidelines. His biting wit has earned him the label of rudest man in England, but he and Annis soon find mutual enjoyment in lively banter. As Carleton and Annis's friendship develops, they discover deeper feelings for each other. Carleton proposes marriage, but Annis refuses, unwilling to relinquish her independence. Using the excuse that he must find Lucilla a new guardian, Carleton returns to London.

Annis's brother, Sir Geoffrey Wychwood, hears rumours of her developing relationship with Carleton and sends his wife and children to Bath to discourage Carleton. Soon after their arrival members of the household contract influenza, and Annis nurses them until she too becomes infected. When Carleton hears that Annis is seriously ill he returns to Bath, arriving on the first day that she is able to get out of bed. Annis agrees to marry Carleton, despite the objections of her brother.

Genre and themes
Like many of Heyer's novels, Lady of Quality is a Regency romance, relying heavily on its setting as a plot device. As noted by literary critic Kay Mussell, Heyer's Regency romances revolved around a "structured social ritualthe marriage market represented by the London season" where "all are in danger of ostracism for inappropriate behavior". Heyer's novels were known for their painstaking attention to detail, which she used to infuse the novels with the "tone of the time".

The heroine, Annis, is one of Heyer's more modern characters. Her wealth and spinsterhood allow her a level of freedom that is unusual in a Heyer novel, as it was in the Regency period. Many of the actions Annis takes, such as moving to a different city despite her family's objections, were common among women living in the 1970s when the novel was written, but in a Regency setting they mark Annis as a bold and unusually independent woman.

Heyer's hero, Carleton, is a worldly and independent man, similar to those found in many of her other novels. In a departure from her other novels however, Carleton is an "unrepentant hero" who refuses to apologise for his past misdeeds and sees no need to change aspects of his behaviour such as his temper. Although in most romance novels the hero changes throughout the course of the narrative, in Lady of Quality Carleton is essentially the same character at the novel's conclusion that he was at its beginning. The sole difference is his realisation that he loves Annis and wishes to marry her.

In contrast to his defiance of society in matters of his own relationships, Carleton is tasked with supervising his niece Lucilla. He must ensure that she is not drawn into a scandal, ruining her prospects of marriage, a role Heyer often gives to her heroes. It is rare that her heroines are given the same responsibility, but in this novel Annis chooses to become involved in shepherding Lucilla through society. Like the hero, the heroine ignores the standards of propriety when she chooses, yet also shelters Lucilla from following her example, as Annis thinks the younger woman lacks the experience to properly judge when it is appropriate to disregard society's mores. Annis's age, and the life experience she has gained, give her a greater ability to manipulate the social standards of her time than a young ingenue. As in Heyer's other novels, her word choice frequently highlights the fact that the heroine's behavior diverges from the socially accepted feminine ideal of the Regency period. Rather than repel others, the unwillingness to conform to the expected behavioural norms endears the heroine to the hero.

Publication and reception
Exact publication figures are unavailable for this book, but a first printing of one of Heyer's novels in the British Commonwealth often consisted of 65,000–75,000 copies, and each of her books generally sold over 500,000 copies in paperback. As with Heyer's other popular fiction, this book was largely ignored by contemporary critics; only after her death did they begin to take more interest in her work.

Philippa Toomey, a literary critic for The Times, wrote a short review of Lady of Quality soon after its publication. While noting that the plots of all Heyer's romance novels were similar, Toomey described Lady of Quality as "almost identical twins" with Heyer's earlier work Black Sheep. Despite the formulaic nature of the plot, Toomey believed that Heyer fans would enjoy the novel, as it showcased Heyer's skill in creating interesting characters who acted appropriately for their setting.

Lady of Quality was profiled in Pamela Regis's 2003 book A Natural History of the Romance Novel. Regis describes the relationship between the protagonists as very modern; both are financially independent, and neither cares overly much for the opinions of others. Literary critic Karin Westman, writing at about the same time agreed, noting that the novel provides "a vision of marriage as companionship, a union which does not require ceding independence ... thanks to a heroine who can conduct herself as a hero".

References

Sources

1972 British novels
Historical novels
Novels by Georgette Heyer
The Bodley Head books
Regency romance novels